Aerococcus sanguinicola is a member of the bacterial genus Aerococcus and is a Gram-positive, catalase-negative coccus growing in clusters. This species was defined in 2001  and has since then been increasingly recognized as a pathogen causing urinary tract infections  and also invasive infections including infective endocarditis. Commercially available biochemical tests fail to properly identify A. sanguinicola  and correct identification can be achieved through genetic or mass spectroscopic methods, such as matrix-assisted laser desorption/ionization time of flight (MALDI-TOF). A. sanguinicola is, with A. urinae, the most common aerococcus isolated from urine, but from blood, A. urinae is much more commonly encountered.

References

External links
Type strain of Aerococcus sanguinicola at BacDive -  the Bacterial Diversity Metadatabase

Lactobacillales